Estadio Gran Canaria is a football stadium in Las Palmas, Canary Islands, Spain. It is currently used for football matches and is home to UD Las Palmas. It was opened in 2003 as a multi-purpose stadium to become the successor of the old Estadio Insular.

History
The stadium was inaugurated on 8 May 2003 with a friendly between UD Las Palmas and Anderlecht which was played in front of a full-capacity seats. The match ended 2–1 in favour of Las Palmas. The first scorer in the stadium was Rubén Castro.

With a capacity of 32,400 seats, it is the 14th-largest stadium in Spain and the largest in the Canary Islands by terms of capacity (Although not the largest in terms of surface area of the pitch is concerned).

Starting from 11 November 2014, the stadium went under restructuring works which will last for about 16 months. After the remodelization, the running track was removed to turn the venue into a football-specific stadium, with the seats closer to the playing ground.

International matches

Spain national team matches

See also 
 Estadio Insular

References

External links 
Estadios de Espana 

UD Las Palmas
Multi-purpose stadiums in Spain
Football venues in the Canary Islands
Sport in Gran Canaria
Buildings and structures in Las Palmas
Sports venues completed in 2003